Ken André Olimb (born January 21, 1989) is a Norwegian professional ice hockey player, currently under contract with Schwenninger Wild Wings of the Deutsche Eishockey Liga (DEL). He is the younger brother of fellow Norwegian international Mathis Olimb.

Playing career
Born and raised in Norway's capital city Oslo, Olimb came through the youth ranks of Manglerud Star. He made his debut in Norway's top-tier during the 2006–07 campaign, playing for Vålerenga. In 2008, he headed to Frisk Asker and after a two-year stint, he took his game abroad, signing with Leksands IF of the Swedish second division Allsvenskan, where he would spend two years. After another year (2012–13) in the Allsvenskan with BIK Karlskoga, he moved to Germany. Olimb spent three years with Düsseldorfer EG of the country's top-tier Deutsche Eishockey Liga (DEL), tallying 44 goals and 87 assists in 159 DEL contests.

In April 2016, he was signed by Linköping HC of the Swedish Hockey League (SHL), where he would play alongside his brother Mathis for the next two seasons.

On April 10, 2018, Olimb as a free agent opted to return for a second stint with Düsseldorfer EG of the DEL, agreeing to a three-year contract through 2021.

On 27 May 2021, Olimb left DEG at the conclusion of his contract, signing a one-year contract to continue in the DEL with the Schwenninger Wild Wings.

International play
Olimb participated at the 2010 IIHF World Championship as a member of the Norway men's national ice hockey team. On January 7, 2014, Olimb was named to Team Norway's official 2014 Winter Olympics roster.

He was named to the Norway men's national ice hockey team for competition at the 2014 IIHF World Championship.

Career statistics

Regular season and playoffs

International

References

External links
 

1989 births
Düsseldorfer EG players
Frisk Asker Ishockey players
Ice hockey players at the 2014 Winter Olympics
Ice hockey players at the 2018 Winter Olympics
Leksands IF players
Linköping HC players
Living people
Norwegian ice hockey left wingers
Olympic ice hockey players of Norway
Ice hockey people from Oslo
Vålerenga Ishockey players
Norwegian expatriate ice hockey people
Norwegian expatriate sportspeople in Germany